Hill v. Colorado, 530 U.S. 703 (2000), was a United States Supreme Court decision.  The Court ruled 6–3 that the First Amendment right to free speech was not violated by a Colorado law limiting protest, education, distribution of literature, or counseling within eight feet of a person entering a healthcare facility.

Background 
In response to protesting at abortion clinics, Colorado legislated that protesters within one hundred feet of any healthcare facility may not approach within eight feet of any other person without consent for the purpose of protest, education, distribution of literature, or counseling.

Question
Does the Colorado law potentially violate the First and Fourteenth Amendment rights of citizens outside healthcare facilities?

Decision

Majority opinion 
Justice John Paul Stevens wrote the majority opinion:
 The state has a compelling interest in creating this legislation. Its interest is to protect citizens entering or exiting a medical facility from unwanted communication. The law does not prevent patients from being communicated with entirely but better allows them to better avoid situations in they wish to not listen to the message of speakers. Even though speakers have a right to persuade, that cannot extend to unwilling listeners because people also have a right "to be let alone."
 As explained in Ward v. Rock Against Racism, legislation restricting speech in addition to requiring a compelling state interest needs to be content neutral. That is specifically important in time, place, and manner legislation. It is content neutral because it does not regulate speech, just one arena for speech. No matter what message a person is trying to convey, the statute would apply. The legislation is not viewpoint-based simply because it was enacted in response to issues being raised by a certain viewpoint.
 The legislation is narrowly tailored to meet the Ward requirements. Also, as the Court explained in Ward, even if the statute is not the least restrictive policy that could satisfy the state's compelling interest, it is sufficient because it leaves open other channels of communication.
 The statute does not completely prevent demonstrators from getting their points heard. Citizens may still yell, hold signs, and convince from eight feet away. The only thing that is seriously impeded is their ability to distribute literature. However, demonstrators can still hand out leaflets to willing recipients.
 Protecting the well being of patients entering or exiting healthcare facilities is specifically targeted by this legislation because they are more likely to be emotionally and physically vulnerable.
 "Prior restraint" arguments claiming that Colorado is putting a prior restraint on constitutionally-protected speech are wrong. Prior restraint is not an issue except in government censorship cases. However, in this case, individuals can choose to deny or permit communication.

Souter's concurring opinion
Justices David Souter, Sandra Day O'Connor, Ruth Bader Ginsburg, and Stephen Breyer concurred:
  The legislation seeks to prevent unwanted approaching, not speech.

Scalia and Thomas's dissenting opinions
Justices Antonin Scalia and Clarence Thomas dissented: 
 This law is not content neutral, as it is obviously being applied only to abortion clinics and anti-abortion messages.
 Protecting citizens from unwanted speech is not a compelling state interest.
 The number of places actually being covered by the statute is very large if one considers the extensive number of healthcare facilities. Therefore, speech is restricted very significantly.
 The law removes one of the few outlets in which peaceful and civil pro-life citizens could get their point across to women on abortion, but now only inappropriate bullying groups will be heard.
 The decision is in conflict with other First Amendment restriction cases. The only reason the Court now changed is that the messages are not content-neutral but are about abortion.

Kennedy's dissenting opinion
Justice Anthony Kennedy dissented:
 The legislation is definitely content based and so directly violates the First Amendment.

See also 
 Heckler's veto
 McCullen v. Coakley (2014)

References

External links

United States Supreme Court cases
United States Supreme Court cases of the Rehnquist Court
United States Free Speech Clause case law
2000 in United States case law
Void for vagueness case law
2000 in Colorado
Legal history of Colorado